Pramod Chandila (born 18 July 1993) is an Indian cricketer who plays for Haryana. He made his first-class debut on 30 October in the 2015–16 Ranji Trophy. He made his Twenty20 debut on 2 January 2016 in the 2015–16 Syed Mushtaq Ali Trophy. He made his List A debut for Bengal in the 2016–17 Vijay Hazare Trophy on 1 March 2017.

He was the leading run-scorer for Haryana in the 2018–19 Vijay Hazare Trophy, with 317 runs in nine matches.

References

External links
 

1993 births
Living people
Indian cricketers
Bengal cricketers
Haryana cricketers
People from Faridabad
Cricketers from Haryana